Ersange is a village in the commune of Waldbredimus, in south-eastern Luxembourg.  , the village has a population of 145.

References

External links

Remich (canton)
Villages in Luxembourg